The London and North Eastern Railway Class P1 Mineral 2-8-2 Mikado was a class of two steam locomotives designed by Nigel Gresley. They were two of the most powerful freight locomotives ever designed for a British railway. It was initially intended they be a more powerful 2-10-0 version of the earlier Class O2 2-8-0s. The design was submitted in August 1923, for use between Peterborough and London, and also between Immingham and Wath marshalling yard. The power was quoted as being 25% more than the O2.

Construction and into service
The first P1, No 2393, was completed by Doncaster in June 1925 and was shown at the Darlington Centenary celebrations in July, with its sister No 2394 following in November 1925. Both were externally rather similar, although 2393 had a 32-element superheater while 2394 had a larger 62-element 'E' type superheater. They were the first 2-8-2 locomotives to be built in Britain for local use, although not the first designed. Both were allocated to New England shed after completion where they were subjected to regular testing.

In service, the P1s could handle 100-wagon coal trains, although these were an operational hazard due to their overhanging track circuits and being too long for many of the passing loops. They were also coal-hungry engines, with a 1926 Locomotive Inspectors Conference Report stating that the engines used  of coal. However, they were still thought of highly enough in 1926 that it was proposed to build another four P1s to replace an equivalent number of 0-8-0s.

The boosters
The P1 class engines were initially equipped with two-cylinder booster engines attached to the trailing axle. They were engaged using a Westinghouse pump mounted on the boiler to engage the cylinder clutch. It was intended by Gresley that these boosters would be used to assist the locomotive while starting, and in topping the banks over which they travelled.

The tenders attached to the P1s had a specially-designed dragbox to accommodate the booster equipment. In practice, the boosters were troublesome. When in operation, they filled the cab with steam, and the fireman's workload was doubled. The steam pipes from the boiler to the booster were prone to fracture, particularly on the sharp curves of the turning triangle at the New England shed. The boosters were removed from engines 2394 and 2393 in 1937 and 1938, respectively.

Service and withdrawal
The two P1s were only ever used between New England and Ferme Park, the only route deemed suitable for them by the Operating Department. In practice there were issues with running such large trains with such powerful engines. The large three-cylinder engines required a considerable effort on the part of the fireman and the booster was known as particularly hungry for steam requiring even more coal. As a result turns firing the P1s were considered as ones to avoid. It was also found that the heavier trains that the P1s could handle were too long for many of the passing loops resulting in delays to passenger trains. In 1934, No. 2394 was experimentally tried on the 07:45 am semi-fast passenger train from Kings Cross to Peterborough as part of the planning stage for P2 class locomotive 2001 Cock o' the North.

This rebuilding, which took place in November and January 1942 for engines 2393 and 2394 respectively, saw them reclassified as Class P1/2.

Due to the reduction of heavy freight trains after the Second World War, both engines were withdrawn and scrapped by Edward Thompson in July 1945, the first Gresley locomotives to be withdrawn and scrapped by intention. The six-wheeled tenders were modified with standard dragboxes to run behind new Thompson Class B2 4-6-0s Nos 2815 and 1632, while the boilers were removed and fitted to Gresley A1s No. 2557 Blair Atholl and 2565 Merry Hampton during their conversion from Class A1 to Class A3.

References

P1
2-8-2 locomotives
Railway locomotives introduced in 1925
Scrapped locomotives
Freight locomotives
Standard gauge steam locomotives of Great Britain
1′D1′ h3 locomotives